Cape Phillips is a cape approximately midway along the east side of Daniell Peninsula, 8 nautical miles (15 km) southeast of Mount Brewster, in Victoria Land. Discovered in January 1841 by Sir James Clark Ross who named it for Lieutenant Charles G. Phillips of the HMS Terror.

Headlands of Victoria Land
Borchgrevink Coast